The Rumor IV Cabinet was the 29th cabinet of the Italian Republic. It held office from 8 July 1973 to 14 March 1974, for a total of 250 days (8 months, 7 days).

Party breakdown
 Christian Democracy (DC): Prime minister, 16 ministers, 32 undersecretaries
 Italian Socialist Party (PSI): 6 ministers, 15 undersecretaries
 Italian Democratic Socialist Party (PSDI): 4 ministers, 9 undersecretaries
 Italian Republican Party (PRI): 2 ministers, 2 undersecretaries

Composition

|}

References

Italian governments
1973 establishments in Italy
1974 disestablishments in Italy
Cabinets established in 1973
Cabinets disestablished in 1974